Ignác Darányi de Pusztaszentgyörgy et Tetétlen (15 January 1849 – 27 April 1927) was a Hungarian politician, who served as Minister of Agriculture twice: between 1895–1903 and 1906–1910. He was a supporter of Gyula Andrássy the Younger.

Biography
He was born into a Hungarian Calvinist noble family in Pest. His parents were Ignác Darányi, a lawyer and Borbála Földváry. He finished his secondary studies at the Buda Royal Grammar School. He graduated on 31 July 1867. He studied law since the next year and finished in 1871.

After obtaining of the leaving certificate he started a work of two-year trainee for György Lövény's lawyer office. He took the lawyer exam in 1873 and became a public lawyer in 1874. He opened an own office together with his father in the Inner City. Sr. Darányi died in 1877, so he continued the work alone until 1892. He travelled around Central Europe in the summer of 1874 on the way of Vienna-München-Zürich-Bern-Vienna.

He became secretary of the Egyesült Fővárosi Takarékpénztár in 1875 and a member of the Committee of Budapest Municipality in 1876. On 3 June 1877 the Darányi family got a noble title. After his father's death he was elected to a directorial member of the National Hungarian Economical Society (OMGE). He helped in the salvage of Szeged floods in 1878.

Darányi worked as a performer for the Parliamentarian Committee of Transport and Finance from 1882. He was a member of the Council of Budapest Public Works since 1887. He abandoned the lawyer practice in 1892 and bought land in the Kiskunság: he farmed on his possessions of Dunaújfalu, Tök, Tass and Anyácsa.

He was a member of the Liberal Party and representative of his party in the Diet of Hungary from 1881 to 1905. He served as deputy chairman of the Liberal Party since 1893 and as deputy speaker of the House of Representatives in 1895. He left the party in 1905 and he was a founding member of the Constitution Party. From 1905 he was an oppositional MEP until 1910 and from this was an independent representative until his death.

Dezső Bánffy appointed him Minister of Agriculture in 1895 and he also hold the position in the Kálmán Széll and the first Károly Khuen-Héderváry cabinets. He became agriculture minister again in 1906. He took the office until the resignation of the Sándor Wekerle administration.

References
 Magyar Életrajzi Lexikon
 Darányi Ignác Emlékkiállítás
 Szalai, Miklós: Ifjabb Andrássy Gyula élete és pályája. MTA Történettudományi Intézete, Budapest, 2003 

1849 births
1927 deaths
People from Pest, Hungary
Hungarian Calvinist and Reformed Christians
Agriculture ministers of Hungary